Mario Ančić (born 30 March 1984) is a Croatian former professional tennis player who currently works as a private equity vice president in New York City. He won three singles titles and five doubles titles. His career-high singles ranking came during the 2006 ATP Tour, when he reached world no. 7. Ančić helped Croatia to win the 2005 Davis Cup and at the Athens Olympic Games in 2004, he and Ivan Ljubičić won a bronze medal in doubles for Croatia.

As a teenager making his Grand Slam debut at the 2002 Wimbledon Championships, he defeated seventh-seeded Roger Federer. His best performance at Grand Slams came at the 2004 Wimbledon Championships, when he reached the semifinals. During 2007 and 2008, infectious mononucleosis and minor injuries forced him to miss many major events, and his ranking dropped from No. 9 in January 2007 to No. 135 in January 2008.

Personal life
Ančić was born in Split, Croatia to Stipe and Nilda Ančić. His father owns a supermarket chain, and his mother is a financial adviser. His older brother Ivica and younger sister Sanja were also professional tennis players.  Ančić was raised in a Catholic family and states that his faith is very important to him. He is very close to his uncle who is a priest and former missionary.

Legal and business career
From 2002 to 2008, Ančić was a law student at the University of Split; he graduated from its law school on 14 April 2008. His thesis described the legal foundation and organisation of the ATP Tour.

Infectious mononucleosis forced Ančić to be off courts in much of the 2009 tennis season, and he started his residency in the law office of Turudić in Zagreb; but he announced he would freeze his residency for some time due to his tennis career. After attending Harvard Law, he graduated with an LLM from Columbia Law School. He became an investment banking associate at Credit Suisse; as of 2019 he is an Associate at One Equity Partners in New York City.

Tennis career

Early career (2000–2002)
As a junior, Ančić rose to No. 1 in the junior world-rankings on 2 January 2001, compiling a singles record of 62–20. He made the finals in the Boys' Singles at the 2000 Australian Open (losing to Andy Roddick) and the 2000 Wimbledon Championships (losing to Nicolas Mahut).

Goran Ivanišević was his doubles partner in his Croatian Davis Cup Team debut and at the 2000 Summer Olympic Games in doubles. At first, Ančić mostly played Futures and Davis Cup tournaments, winning one title in Zagreb; and from August 2001 he started to play Challenger tournaments, winning four in singles and one in doubles. He compiled a record of 30–16 in Challenger play in 2002.

ATP Tour career (2002–2005)
His ATP debut was at Miami Masters, where he drew a wild card, but he lost in the opening round. The highlight of his Grand Slam debut at the 2002 Wimbledon Championships was the major upset of his first round defeat of Roger Federer, the seventh seed, 6–3, 7–6(2), 6–3 in just under two hours. He finished the 2002 season in the top 100 in singles.

At the ATP Indesit Milano Indoor in February 2004, Ančić made it into his first singles ATP final, defeating sixth seed Rafael Nadal and third seed Tommy Robredo. At the 2004 Wimbledon Championships, Ančić had his best Grand Slam result, reaching the semi-finals. In reaching the Grand Slam semi-finals, he jumped 36 places on the ATP singles ranking to No. 27. In doubles, he teamed up with Ivan Ljubičić, and represented Croatia at the 2004 Summer Olympics. They won a bronze medal, losing to González and Nicolás Massú in the semi-final. He won his first ATP singles title at the Ordina Open. His 2005 highlights also include the final at the Japan Open Tennis Championships, losing to Wesley Moodie.

Career apex (2006)
Ančić started on the 2006 ATP Tour with strong note in his second tournament of the year in Auckland, where he defeated top seed Fernando González on his way to the final. In February, he also reached the final in Marseille, losing to Arnaud Clément. He made in the quarter-finals at two Masters and two Grand Slams tournaments. Ančić was defeated by David Nalbandian at Miami and Rome and by Roger Federer at the French Open and Wimbledon. He also reached his career high at Master Series event, reaching the semi-finals at Hamburg Masters. Ančić successfully defended his 2005 title at 's-Hertogenbosch. After Wimbledon, Ančić reached No. 7, his career high in singles.

At the 2006 French Open, he had a shoving incident with Paul Capdeville at the end of his second-round match. Ančić was bothered by the Chilean's repeated complaints to the chair umpire, including just before the post-match handshake. Both of them were fined $3,000. He reached the quarter-finals before losing to Federer.

Ančić missed the U.S. hard-court season due to a knee injury received in a jet skiing accident. In September, in the first event after the summer injuries, he reached the final at the China Open, losing to Marcos Baghdatis. In October, he won his third singles title at the St. Petersburg Open. At the Paris Masters, Ančić lost to Nikolay Davydenko in the quarterfinals.

Mononucleosis, and return to the Tour (2007–2010)
He entered the 2007 Australian Open as the ninth seed, and advanced to a fourth round.

In Marseille, Ančić retired in the first round and was diagnosed with infectious mononucleosis (mono). Later, he confessed that he was playing sick a week before in a match against Germany in the Davis Cup, and the virus had started to affect him at the Australian Open. Due to his illness, Ančić spent most of the next 10 weeks in bed and missed six months from the tour.

Ančić started training in June with his Swedish coach Fredrik Rosengren. After he withdrew from two tournaments in July, Ančić returned in August at the Canada Masters and the Cincinnati Masters, where he lost in the second rounds. Ančić fractured a small bone at the gym a week before the US Open, which was the third Grand Slam he missed in 2007. In October, he made his first big result after the illness, making it into the quarterfinals at Madrid Masters. In 2007, he dropped to No. 83 at the end of the year.

Ančić started the 2008 season again with illness and was forced to withdraw from the tournaments in Australia, missing his fourth Grand Slam in a row. His first 2008 event was in Marseille in February, where he eventually lost in the final to Andy Murray. At the Indian Wells Masters and Miami Masters, Ančić entered the main draw by receiving wild cards, where he beat three seeded players.

Having lost in an opening round at the Canada Masters, and having skipped the Cincinnati Masters as the fatigue intensified and the weight loss mounted, Ančić withdrew from the 2008 Summer Olympics, and later the US Open, due to a recurrence of mononucleosis. Ančić returned in September, playing for the Davis Cup. After a good start at the beginning of the 2009 season, Ančić announced in May that he would pull out of the French Open, Wimbledon, and the Davis Cup semifinal match, again because recurrence of mononucleosis.

Ančić returned to the main tour level at the 2010 BNP Paribas Open, where he made it to the third round. He played Challengers without success.

Retirement
On 21 February 2011, Ančić announced his retirement from professional tennis due to recurring mononucleosis. He ended his career with three titles, 208 wins and 135 losses. On 23 February 2011, Ančić held a press conference at the Firule tennis club, where he officially retired from professional tennis. He stated that; "[My] heart wanted, but [my] body couldn't, this is the toughest moment of my life. I have never run away from responsibility. I always strived for perfection, and when I realized that my body cannot provide the kind of tennis I can play, there was no other solution".

Significant finals

Olympics medal matches

Doubles: 1 (1 bronze medal)

ATP career finals

Singles: 11 (3 titles, 8 runner-ups)

Doubles: 5 (5 titles)

ATP Challenger and ITF Futures finals

Singles: 10 (5–5)

Doubles: 7 (3–4)

Junior Grand Slam finals

Singles: 2 (2 runner-ups)

Performance timelines

Singles

 NMS – from 2009, Hamburg Masters is not Masters Series event
 Davis Cup and World Team Cup matches are included in the statistics.
 1 – before 2002, he had 4–1 (Carpet: 3–1, Grass: 1–0) score in Davis Cup matches.

Doubles

ATP Tour career earnings

Top 10 wins

See also
 Croatia Davis Cup Team
 Goran Ivanišević

References

External links

 
 
 

1984 births
Living people
Columbia Law School alumni
Croatian male tennis players
Hopman Cup competitors
National Basketball Association executives
Olympic bronze medalists for Croatia
Olympic tennis players of Croatia
Tennis players from Split, Croatia
Tennis players at the 2000 Summer Olympics
Tennis players at the 2004 Summer Olympics
University of Split alumni
Olympic medalists in tennis
Croatian expatriate sportspeople in Monaco
Croatian expatriates in the United States
Medalists at the 2004 Summer Olympics
Novak Djokovic coaches